Events from the year 2001 in Sweden

Incumbents
 Monarch – Carl XVI Gustaf
 Prime Minister – Göran Persson

Events

January
 1 January - The name day list is updated.
 1 January - The Swedish Defence Research Agency is established.
 6 January - Landskrona Station is opened.
 16 January - The music concert Artister mot nazister is held in Globen.
 18 January - Nicola Vasmatzis is shot dead in a restroom at Bromma Gymnasium in Stockholm.
 19 January - Lennart Daleus resigns as leader of the Centre Party.

February
 11 February - Several houses from the 18th century burn down on the Arkadien block in eastern Jönköping.

March
 7 March - The Minister of Commerce and Industry Leif Pagrotsky and the Member of the European Parliament Marit Paulsen each get a cake thrown at their necks at a debate evening in Lund.
 15 March - The Alcohol Committee is established.
 19 March - Maud Olofsson is elected leader of the Centre Party at a party conference. After the 2002 election, the Centre Party's first electoral upturn since 1973 was attributed to the "Maud effect."
 25 March - Sweden joins the Schengen Area.

April
 17 April - The Minister for Finance Bosse Ringholm is caked by a 21-year-old member of the Stockholm Cake Brigade when making the budget walk on Drottninggatan.

May
 22 May - The Stockholm Convention on Persistent Organic Pollutants is signed in Stockholm.
 29 May - Norrtåg is founded.

June
 14 June - 16 June - A European Council meeting is held in Gothenburg which causes the Gothenburg Riots.

July
 1 July - A new citizenship law is put into effect which allows Multiple citizenship.
 28 July - 5 August - Sweden's first major and international scout camp, SCOUT 2001, is held in Rinkaby, Kristianstad.
 31 July - Nordea buys Postgirot.

August
 1 August - The People's Park in Karlskoga burns down.
 15 August - Christina Jutterström becomes new CEO for SVT.

September
 5 September - The Kolbäck Bridge in Umeå is opened.
 11 September - A massive flood originating from the Selånger River destroys parts of Sundsvall.
 15 September - Löfbergs Arena in Karlstad is opened.
 16 September - The 2001 Church of Sweden elections are held.

October
 21 October - Hammarby Fotboll win their first gold in Swedish Championship in football.

November
 12 November - One of Sweden's oldest churches Södra Råda Old Church in Gullspång burns down after an arson attack by a 23-year-old murderer.

December
 6 December - The Carlbeck Committee is established.
 10 December - The Nobel Prize turns 100 and 161 previous winners are invited for its birthday party.
 18 December - The Repatriation of Ahmed Agiza and Muhammad al-Zery takes place.
 31 December - Jan Malmsjö reads Ring Out, Wild Bells at Skansen due to Margaretha Krooks death.

Popular culture

Film
 24 October – Deadline, directed by Colin Nutley, released in Sweden 
 Buy Bye Beauty, documentary film directed by Pål Hollender

Sports 
 24 March-1 April – The Bandy World Championship 2001 for men was played in Sweden and Finland

Births

 19 June – William Hansson, alpine ski racer.

Deaths

 10 February – Helge Bengtsson, footballer (born 1916)
 21 February – Philip Sandblom, sailor (born 1903).
 23 April – Lennart Atterwall, javelin thrower (born 1911).
 4 May – Arne Sucksdorff, film director (born 1917).
 7 May – Margaretha Krook, stage and film actress (born 1925).
 16 September – Ann-Margret Ahlstrand, athlete (born 1905)
 9 November – Tore Zetterholm, novelist, playwright and journalist (born 1915).
 10 November – Carl-Gustav Esseen, mathematician (born 1918)
 12 December – Berit Granquist, fencer (born 1909)

References

2001 in Sweden
Years of the 21st century in Sweden
Sweden
2000s in Sweden
Sweden